Azapa Formation is a geological formation in northern Chile made up of gravels of fluvial origin. It is conformably overlain by Oxaya Formation. Azapa Formation is deformed by the Oxaya anticline.

References 

Geologic formations of Chile
Oligocene Series of South America
Oligocene volcanism
Neogene Chile
Geology of Arica y Parinacota Region